Phiravich Attachitsataporn (born 5 March 1998), nicknamed Mean is a Thai television actor, director, and model. He is best known for his role as Tin in the 2018 Thai television drama Love by Chance. He featured with main roles in movies such as "Blood Valentine" (2019), and "Pee Nak 2" (2020). He also had a lead role in a series "My Bubble Tea", "Win 21 Ded Jai Tur", and "The Graduates" (2020).

Early life and education
Phiravich Attachitsataporn was born on 5 March 1998 in Chachoengsao, Thailand. He was once the president of the youth in his hometown, Chachoengsao. At the time of its management, its members were only 20-30 members. He graduated Faculty of journalism and Mass communication from Thammasat University.

Career
Mean made his acting debut with a guest role in the Thai BL series Love Sick: The Series Season 2 (2015) in 2015, a talent-searching and reality TV programme produced by Channel 9.

In 2016, he then starred supporting role as Tonson in the Thai drama series I Love The Fat Guy 2 (2016) and Make It Right: The Series (2016) where he played the role as Champ.

Mean rose to fame with his role as Tin in the 2018 Thai BL drama series Love by Chance which aired on LINE TV and GMM 25 on August 3, 2018. In November it was announced that Mean was cast in the Mono29 movie Blood Valentine playing a police officer. On July 29, Mean's Mono29 movie, Touchdown Kiss, where he plays as Quentin will be released.

Mean made his directorial debut with the series The Yearbook which was adapted from the short film school project "The Yearbook" written by him. The executive producer of the series is Witwisit Hiranyawongkul.

Discography

Songs

Filmography

Movie

Series

Music video

Stage play

Concert 
Kissboys TH The Final Concert (8 September 2019)
 Channel 3 Super Fan Live!: SUPERNOVA Universe Explosion Concert

Variety shows

MC 
 Television 
 2022: ซุปตาร์เวลานอก by สีสันบันเทิง On Air 3HD33 (รับเชิญเทปวันที่ 5,6 มีนาคม) ร่วมกับ Mil Sarut Nawapraditkul

 Online 
 2021: คิดถึงไก่หมายยย EP.1 On Air YouTube:MEAN PHIRAVICH OFFICIAL

Awards and nominations

References

External links 

 
 

1998 births
Living people
Phiravich Attachitsataporn
Phiravich Attachitsataporn
Phiravich Attachitsataporn
Phiravich Attachitsataporn
Phiravich Attachitsataporn
Thai television personalities
Phiravich Attachitsataporn
Phiravich Attachitsataporn
Phiravich Attachitsataporn
Phiravich Attachitsataporn